The Science and Technology Directorate (S&T) is a component within the United States Department of Homeland Security. DHS-S&T serves as the research and development arm of the Department as it fulfills its national security mission.

The Science and Technology Directorate is led by the Under Secretary of Homeland Security for Science and Technology, who is appointed by the President of the United States with confirmation by the United States Senate. Dimitri Kusnezov is the Under Secretary.

Initiatives and programs
The Under Secretary for Homeland Security Science and Technology currently administers a number of publicly available programs to promote independent development of homeland security technologies.

SAFECOM is the Federal umbrella program designed to foster interoperability among the Nation’s public safety practitioners, so that they may communicate across disciplines and jurisdictions during an emergency.

SAFETY Act provides liability protections that make it feasible for sellers of qualified antiterrorism technologies to introduce homeland security solutions to the marketplace.

Homeland Open Security Technology (HOST) is a five-year, $10 million program to promote the creation and use of open security and open-source software in the United States government and military. In October 2011, the directorate won the Open Source for America 2011 Government Deployment Open Source Award for the program.

Notable previous Under Secretaries include Dr. Tara O'Toole and Dr. Reginald Brothers.

The directorate's Office of National Laboratories operates six facilities:

 Chemical Security Analysis Center at the Aberdeen Proving Ground in Maryland
 National Biodefense Analysis and Countermeasures Center at Fort Detrick in Maryland
 National Urban Security Technology Laboratory in Manhattan, New York
 Transportation Security Laboratory in Atlantic City, New Jersey
 Plum Island Animal Disease Center near Orient, New York
 National Bio and Agro-Defense Facility in Manhattan, Kansas

Budget

See also
Virtual USA

References

External links
 
 S&T organizational chart (May 16, 2022)
 S&T 2021 Strategic Plan

United States Department of Homeland Security